Pindi Gheb Tehsil  (in Punjabi  and   ) is an administrative subdivision (tehsil), of Attock District in the Punjab Province of Pakistan, the capital is the town of Pindi Gheb.

The tehsil is administratively subdivided into 13 Union Councils, two of which form the capital - Pindi Gheb.

History
The Imperial Gazetteer of India, compiled over a century ago during British rule, described the tehsil as follows:

"Pindi Gheb Tahsīl.-Tahsīl of Attock District, Punjab. The Indus River bounds it on the north-west. Its highest point lies in the Kala Chitta Range. The tahsīl is mainly a bleak, dry, undulating and often stony tract, broken by ravines, and -sloping from east to west: a country of rough scenery, sparse population, and scanty rainfall. West along the Indus are the ravines and
pebble ridges which surround Makhad. Only near Pindi Gheb town does the broad bed of the Sil river show a bright oasis of cultivation among the dreary uplands which compose the rest of the tahsīl. The population in 1901 was 106,437, compared with 99,350 in 1891. It contains the town of Pindi Gheb (population, 8,452), the headquarters; and 134 villages. The land revenue and cesses in 1903-4 amounted to 1 -9 lakhs."

According to Attock district gazetteer 1930(Punjab District Gazetteers Volume XXIX-A, Attock District), In Tehsil Pindigheb the tribal distribution is simple as compared to other tehsils of attock district. The whole of the south east and centre is held by the Jodhra tribe. Along the hills above the Indus river are Sagri Pathans of Makhad. A solid Awan tract intervenes between the Johdras and the Pathans and runs from the south to the north of the tehsil. Last the Khattar tribe holds the north east of the tehsil along the Attock border. These four tribes own practically the whole of the Pindigheb Tehsil, and their present boundaries are the result violent fighting during the break-up of the Mughal and Sikh rules.

The following statement shows the percentage of cultivated area owned by each tribe of Pindigheb Tehsil according to Attock district gazetteer 1930 (Punjab District Gazetteers Volume XXIX-A, Attock District): Jodhras(30%) Awans (32%) Khattar (17%) Pathans (10%) Rajput Chohan (3%) Sayeds (3%) Others (5%).Sourag is the one of the oldest village of Tehsil.

References

Punjab, Pakistan